The 1993 Speedway World Team Cup was the 34th edition of the FIM Speedway World Team Cup to determine the team world champions.

The final was staged at the Brandon Stadium in Coventry, England. The United States won their fourth title.

Qualification

Group D

 May 2, 1993
  Krsko

***Abandoned after heat 17 due to rain. Result stands after 16 heats

Russia to Group C

Group C

 May 9
  Wiener Neustadt

Germany to Group B after Gerd Riss beat Mikhail Starostin in a race-off for first place.

Group B

 June 27, 1993
  Toruń
 Att: 12 000

Poland to Group A.

Group A

 August 22, 1993
  Slangerup

Denmark to Final.

World Final
 September 19, 1993
  Coventry, Brandon Stadium

See also
 1993 Individual Speedway World Championship
 1993 Speedway World Pairs Championship

References

Speedway World Team Cup
1993 in speedway